Andrey Vasilyevich Razin (born 19 September 1962) is a Soviet sprinter. He competed in the men's 100 metres at the 1988 Summer Olympics.

References

External links
 

1962 births
Living people
Athletes (track and field) at the 1988 Summer Olympics
Soviet male sprinters
Olympic athletes of the Soviet Union
Place of birth missing (living people)
Universiade medalists in athletics (track and field)
Universiade silver medalists for the Soviet Union